Huke is a surname. Notable people with the surname include:

Kirsti Huke (born 1977), Norwegian musician and composer
Michael Huke (born 1969), German sprinter
Sebastian Huke (born 1989), German footballer
Shane Huke (born 1985), English footballer
Te Huke (born c. 1700), former king of Easter Island

See also
Hukerd, a village in Iran